KXPB-LP (89.1 FM, "Your host on the Coast") is a radio station broadcasting a variety music format. Licensed to Pacific Beach, Washington, United States, the station is currently owned by the Pacific Beach Food Bank. It serves Pacific Beach and Moclips, Washington.

See also
List of community radio stations in the United States

References

External links
 
 

XPB-LP
XPB-LP
Grays Harbor County, Washington
Community radio stations in the United States